Bishal Ghosh (born 27 April 1996) is an Indian cricketer. He made his first-class debut for Tripura in the 2014–15 Ranji Trophy on 7 December 2014. He made his Twenty20 debut for Tripura in the 2016–17 Inter State Twenty-20 Tournament on 29 January 2017. He made his List A debut for Tripura in the 2016–17 Vijay Hazare Trophy on 25 February 2017.

In November 2018, he became the third batsman to score a double century for Tripura in the Ranji Trophy, when he made 201 runs against Services.

References

External links
 

1996 births
Living people
Indian cricketers
Tripura cricketers
Place of birth missing (living people)